William Peter Randall (born November 27, 1964 in Barrie, Ontario) is a Canadian musician and municipal politician.

While studying recorded music production and general arts and science at Fanshawe College in London, Ontario, he hinted at a later political career by serving as General Arts and Sciences Member At Large. He then moved to Toronto to pursue acting and a music career.

His first release with his band Timeline was entitled Living on the Timeline and released on Random Records in 1986. Two solo albums followed, Better Times in 1988 and Slapped in the Face by a Rainbow in 1990. Some of these tracks were featured on New Stuff new artist samplers.

With a new band in tow, Peter Randall and the Raindogs, he travelled and made multiple appearances on shows such as Citytv Toronto's Breakfast Television and Lunch Television. Their debut self-titled release was produced by Ken Greer of Red Rider fame at Metalworks Studios in Mississauga and released in 1994.

Randall's travels and humanitarian work have led him from Israeli Kibbutz to Goa, India seniors homes, animal shelters and kindergartens and Nicaraguan schools outside Managua, where he worked as a volunteer with The Canadian Light Brigade.

Settling down in wine country in Lincoln, Ontario, Randall was first elected as a town Alderman in 2000. He was then elected as Councillor for Ward Four in 2006.

In 2004 he co-wrote the track "Love Crime" with fellow Fanshawe College alumna Emm Gryner for CBC Radio's All for a Song CD.

In 2017 he wrote "All The Same" for Momentum Special Needs Choir who performed it at their year-end gala.

Discography
 1986 – Timeline – Living on the Timeline
 1988 – Peter Randall – Slapped in the Face by a Rainbow
 1989 – Various – Horizons '89
 1990 – Peter Randall – Better Times
 1994 – The Raindogs – The Raindogs

Video singles
 1990 – Grow Old With Me
 1990 – What Do You Want
 1995 – Pity?

External links
Fanshawe College Alumni News, "Fanshawe Coast to Coast" (article notes Randall as 1986 MIA graduate, co-writing with Emm Gryner for CBC, Spring 2004, PDF format)
Music database shows New Stuff Compilation for sale (article notes "Randall" solo track included with tunes by Moxy Früvous, The Wild Strawberries, Satellites and The Irish Descendants)
Webpage denotes Town of Lincoln Ward Four Councillor – W. Peter Randall.
The Internet Movie Database (IMDb) shows Peter Randalls crew credit in 1998's Still Life aka The Art Killer.
Regional Councillor Hopes to Eliminate Own Seat
Former Ward 4 Alderman Throws Hat Into Election Ring

1964 births
Canadian male singers
Canadian pop singers
Canadian male singer-songwriters
Canadian singer-songwriters
Ontario municipal councillors
Musicians from Barrie
Living people
Writers from Ontario
Fanshawe College alumni